This is a list of yearly Southwest Conference football standings.

Southwest standings

References

Southwest Conference
Standings